Misfits Records is an independent record label conceived of in 2002 by founders Jerry Only of the Misfits and John Cafiero of Osaka Popstar. Intended to release Misfits material after the band's contractual obligations to Roadrunner Records were fulfilled by 2001's Cuts from the Crypt, the label's first non-Misfits signing was Japanese horror punk band Balzac, and its first release was the Misfits/Balzac split single "Day the Earth Caught Fire". In 2003 the label became a formal company and launched worldwide with its first full-length releases. Misfits Records has also released material by The Nutley Brass, Osaka Popstar, and JuiceheaD.

Releases

References

Record labels established in 2002
Punk record labels
Horror punk record labels
American independent record labels
2002 establishments in New York City